Orust Municipality (Orusts kommun) is a municipality in Västra Götaland County in western Sweden. Its seat is located in the town of Henån, with an approximate population of 1,800.

The municipality includes Sweden's third largest island Orust and some other small adjacent islets. The year-round population of around 15,000 increases significantly in the summer due to an influx of summer vacationers.

The former municipal entities on the island Orust and adjacent minor islands were grouped into larger units in 1952 and united into a single municipality in connection with the nationwide municipal reform of 1971.

Geography

The villages in the municipality are Ellös, Henån, Hälleviksstrand, Mollösund, Svanvik and Varekil.

History
Historically, the area has been inhabited for thousands of years, as evident by ancient remains such as tombs, grave fields and rock carvings. Dating from the Viking Age, runestones are plentiful throughout Orust.

In the Nordisk familjebok the island of Orust is mentioned as a Geatish territory. Ramshult (the modern Swedish form), a hill fort, is mentioned in Beowulf as Hrefnesholt, the Geatish hill fort which became the prison of Onela, Ohthere and their mother until their rescue by Ongenþeow.

Economy
Industry wise, the area has always been dominated by fishing and boat production. Shipyard Hallberg-Rassy is the largest employer nowadays. Its shipyard is located in Ellös, on the north-west part of the island, and it has a significant export of sailing boats. The second largest employer is Najad-varvet, also a shipyard.

Points of interest

The geography offers several sights, with a couple of picturesque small villages. A nature reserve called Morlanda features a lookout point that offers a good overview of the area.

See also
Orust Eastern Hundred, historical hundred
Orust Western Hundred, historical hundred
Varekilsnäs, most southern village on Orust

References

External links

Orust Municipality - Official site
Orust map - From the official site

Municipalities of Västra Götaland County
Gothenburg and Bohus